The Assistant Secretary of State for International Organization Affairs is the head of the Bureau of International Organization Affairs within the United States Department of State that creates and executes policy in international organizations such as the United Nations. The U.S. Department of State created the position of Assistant Secretary of State for United Nations Affairs in February 1949, using one of the six Assistant secretary positions originally authorized by Congress in 1944. On August 25, 1954, a Department administrative action changed the incumbent's designation to Assistant Secretary of State for International Organization Affairs. The current head of the Bureau is Ambassador Michele J. Sison.

Assistant Secretaries of State for International Organization Affairs

References

 
United States and the United Nations